Dovgun (Cyrillic: Довгун), also transliterated Dovhun, or Dolgun, is a surname. Notable people with the surname include:

 Alexander Dolgun (1926–1986), American gulag survivor
 Olga Dovgun (born 1970), Kazakhstani sports shooter
 Vitaliy Dovgun (born 1971), Kazakhstani sport shooter

See also
 
 L-vocalization
 Dovhan

East Slavic-language surnames